The New Jersey Wing of the Civil Air Patrol (CAP) is the highest echelon of Civil Air Patrol in the state of New Jersey. New Jersey Wing headquarters are located at Joint Base McGuire–Dix–Lakehurst. New Jersey Wing consists of over 1,400 auxiliary airmen at over 27 locations across the state of New Jersey.

The wing was founded on December 1, 1941. It styles itself "The Birthplace of Civil Air Patrol"..

Mission
The Civil Air Patrol has three primary missions: providing emergency services; offering cadet programs for youth; and providing aerospace education for CAP members and the general public.

Emergency services
The New Jersey Wing Civil Air Patrol is tasked with aeronautical search and rescue missions for the state of New Jersey, coordinated by the Air Force Rescue Coordination Center. The Wing maintains ground search and rescue teams consisting of both cadets and senior members to act in tandem with aerial surveillance efforts. The Civil Air Patrol also provides humanitarian support in support of the Red Cross, airborne imagery and communications support for the Federal Emergency Management Agency (FEMA) and the National Weather Service, as well as the US Army Corps and Engineers and other agencies as well as counter-drug operations. The NJ Wing is also a member of New Jersey Task Force One, the State of New Jersey disaster relief and emergency response task force coordinated by the NJ State Police. The CAP also provides Air Force support through conducting light transport, communications support, and low-altitude route surveys.

In November 2012, after Hurricane Sandy struck the east coast of the United States, the New Jersey Wing assisted in the disaster response. Aircrews flew aerial imagery missions providing more than 71,000
high-resolution images of damaged areas throughout the state. NJ Wing also flew FEMA personnel for damage assessment and reconnaissance missions, . On the ground, more than 50 members provided over 1,500 man-hours supporting Pleasantville Red Cross Shelter. Over the 52 consecutive days the Civil Air Patrol was mobilized in response to Sandy, 146 New Jersey Wing members contributed over 7,000 hours of volunteer service.

Cadet programs
The Civil Air Patrol offers a cadet program for youth aged 12 to 21. The cadet program is organized around four main program elements: leadership, aerospace, fitness, and character. Cadets progress through the self-paced program to complete tasks in each program area in order to earn promotions and awards.

Aerospace education
The Civil Air Patrol promotes and supports aerospace education, both for its own members and the general public. Cadets are offered aerospace education as a part of the cadet program. Teachers can get free classroom materials and lesson plans from CAP through CAP’s Aerospace Education Membership program.

Organization

See also

Awards and decorations of the Civil Air Patrol
New Jersey Air National Guard
New Jersey Naval Militia
New Jersey State Guard

References

External links
New Jersey Wing Civil Air Patrol official website

Wings of the Civil Air Patrol
Education in New Jersey
Military in New Jersey
Military units and formations established in 1941
1941 establishments in New Jersey